The General Electric CJ610 is a non-afterburning turbojet engine derived from the military J85, and is used on a number of civilian business jets. The model has logged over 16.5 million hours of operation. Civilian versions have powered business jets such as the Learjet 23 and the Hamburger Flugzeugbau HFB 320 Hansa Jet. The engines are also used in the flyable Messerschmitt Me 262 reproductions built by the Me 262 Project in the United States.

A development, the CF700, added a rear-mounted fan mounted directly on the free-running low-pressure turbine.

Variants
CJ610-1 thrust
CJ610-2B thrust
CJ610-4 thrust
CJ610-6 thrust
CJ610-8A thrust
CJ610-9 thrust

Applications

 Aero Commander 1121 Jet Commander
 HFB 320 Hansa Jet
 Learjet 23
 Learjet 24
 Learjet 25
 Learjet 28
 Margański & Mysłowski EM-10 Bielik
 Messerschmitt Me 262 replicas A-1c and B-1c.
 Transall C-160 (APU)
 Viper Aircraft Viperjet MKII

Other
 Screaming Sasquatch Jet Waco Biplane
 Yak 110

Specifications (CJ610-9)

See also

References

 
 Taylor, John W.R. Jane's All the World's Aircraft 1972-73., London, Sampson Low, Marston and Company Ltd, 1972. ISBN 354-00109-4.

External links
 GE CJ610 web page

1960s turbojet engines
CJ610